Willem Brandwijk (born 31 July 1995) is a Dutch basketball player for Donar of the BNXT League. He spent his college career at IUP Crimson Hawks men's basketball and Siena Saints men's basketball.

Professional career
On 2 July 2019, Brandwijk signed with Feyenoord Basketbal of the Dutch Basketball League (DBL) for the 2019–20 season. There, he would play under Netherlands national team coach Toon van Helfteren.

On 7 July 2020, Brandwijk signed a 2-year contract with Donar. Brandwijk won his first silverware in the 2021–22 season, as he won the Dutch Cup with Donar. On 22 June 2022, he extended his contract with two more seasons until 2024.

National team career
In August 2017, Brandwijk was first selected for the Netherlands national basketball team. In June 2018, he was selected by coach van Helfteren for the qualification games for the 2019 FIBA Basketball World Cup.

References

1995 births
Living people
Donar (basketball club) players
Dutch expatriate basketball people in the United States
Dutch men's basketball players
IUP Crimson Hawks men's basketball players
Sportspeople from Voorburg
Dutch Basketball League players
Feyenoord Basketball players
Power forwards (basketball)
Siena Saints men's basketball players
Small forwards